Berkcan Güven (born 30 May 1996), also known as BEGE, is a Turkish influencer, YouTuber and singer. With more than 4 million subscribers, Güven's channel is among the top 25 most-subscribed YouTube channels in Turkey as of May 2020. In 2021 he released his debut album as BEGE. The album ranked 4th on Spotify Global Charts.

Career 
He has been shooting videos on games, music and entertainment since 2014. With the release of his diss track "YouTube Benim İşim" in 2017 and the songs "Yeniden" and "Neresi?" he managed to garner critical acclaim. His family members also regularly appear in his videos. The music video for "Yeniden" also featured appearances by Aleyna Tilki as a guest star and the video itself became trending in Turkey. After that he released "İlerle" in 2020.

In 2019, he came together with celebrities such as Ben Fero, Reynmen, Unlost and Efe Uygaç to start a donation campaign in his grandmother's name and donated 200,000 to the Hospice Presidency.

Personal life 
Güven is the son of voice actor and artist Burhan Güven. As of 2019, he is studying Visual Communication Design at Işık University.

Discography 
Güven has released records under the names Lil Bege and BEGE. The following is a list made by the data provided by Genius.

Albums 
 BEGEFENDİ (2021)

Singles 
 Çok Yakışıklıyım (2016)
 Para Bizde (Çok yakışıklıyım part 2) (ft. Efe Uygaç) (2017)
 Kilo Aldım (ft. EFESAVAGE) (2017)
 #Biziz (Reynmen ft. Lil Bege) (2017)
 YOUTUBE BENİM İŞİM (2017)
 Fenomen (ft. Ezhel) (2017)
 Berkcan Güven (ft. Çengel Tayfa) (2018)
 Yeniden  (ft. Nova Norda) (2019)
 İlerle (2020)
 Spacejump (2020)
 Harman (2020)
 Nazar (2020)
 Eksi (ft. Murda, Summer Cem) (2021)
 B.S.G. (ft. Emir Taha) (2021)

Awards

See also 
 List of YouTubers

References

External links 
 Berkcan Güven on YouTube
 
 Berkcan Güven on Spotify
 

1996 births
Living people
Singers from Istanbul
Turkish YouTubers
Turkish rappers